Haddington Rugby Football Club is a rugby union team based in Haddington, East Lothian.

History

Founded in 1911, the team plays its home games at Neilson Park.

The Club is rightly proud of its history, which includes the Haddington player Jock Wemyss founding the Co-optimists; following a Barbarians inspired match in Haddington in 1924.

They compete in BT National League Division 3, the 3rd tier of Scottish club rugby.

Player Development

The minis section was set up almost 50 years ago by the late, great Bill Hamilton.

The minis and the School of Rugby with Knox Academy are key to the ongoing success serving as nursery for players. Haddington currently have over 100 kids in each; and the club are delighted that they recently managed to play a couple of girls matches as they seek to develop a ladies team.

There is a great tradition of families serving the Club, with many sets of brothers, fathers sons and grandsons turning out.

World Record

On 12 August 2018, the Club set a World Record of 467 for the most participants in a touch/mini/tag game of rugby, ratified by Guinness World Records.  In the game, players from age 5 to 73 turned out, including 18 from the Snodgrass Family, covering three generations a former President and two former Captains.

Haddington Sevens

The club ran the Haddington Sevens tournament.  Dating from 1926, the club claims it is the 10th oldest surviving in the World.

Notable players

Five of the club's players have represented Scotland at full international level: Jock Wemyss, RJC Ronnie Glasgow, Derek White, Grant McKelvey and Cammy Murray. Wemyss at 17 was one of the five founding members.  The Internationalists were honoured in a lunch in 2017, with tributes paid amongst others by Finlay Calder, Dave Rollo, Craig Chalmers, Barry Stewart and, for Wemyss the President of the Barbarians Mickey Steele Bodger.

White toured with the 1989 Lions and Glasgow. He played for the World XV in 1964.

Honours

Men

 Haddington Sevens
 Champions (8): 1933, 1950, 1951, 1955, 1956, 1961, 1969, 1970
 Scottish National League Division Two
 Champions (1): 2006-07
 Glasgow City Sevens
 Champions (4): 1955, 1956, 1957, 1958
Peebles Sevens
 Champions (2): 1977, 1982
Walkerburn Sevens
 Champions (6): 1976, 1978, 1980, 2004, 2006, 2017
 Musselburgh Sevens
 Champions (8): 1971, 1976, 1977, 1978, 1982, 1983, 1986, 1991
 Royal HSFP Sevens
 Champions (1): 1985
 Preston Lodge Sevens
 Champions (1): 1987
 Penicuik Sevens
 Champions (2): 1969, 1985
 Edinburgh District Sevens
 Champions (1): 1951
 North Berwick Sevens
 Champions (4): 1970, 1971, 1977, 2014

Women

 Lismore Sevens
 Champions (1): 1995

References  

Rugby union in East Lothian
Scottish rugby union teams
Haddington, East Lothian